Rattota Divisional Secretariat is a Divisional Secretariat  of Matale District, of Central Province, Sri Lanka.

Geography
The division mostly consists of mountains, hills, and inaccessible places, and southern and eastern boundaries are covered by the range of Hunnasgiri mountain and Knuckles Mountain Range which has been introduced as world heritage.
Rattota Division consists of three climatic zones. They are,
Upcountry intercentral zone
Mid country wet zone
Mid country inter central zone
Annual rainfall is between 1000-2500ml. The maximum rainfall of 2500ml receives in December and January. The minimum rainfall receives in July and August. The hottest month is August. January has a very cool climate. Average temperature is 24-30○C.

History
When Sri Lanka became a colony in 1815, Rattota had been included to Kandy Udarata regime. Since 1819, Rattota was included to Matale under the administration of Kandy Government Agent.In 1955 Matale became a separate district and Rattota became a part of it. After gaining the independence from Britain in 1948, Matale district was divided in to three revenue divisions and Rattota was the southern part of it. The number of divisions in Matale district was increased to 10 in 1963, and Rattota became a separate division.
Since the Grama Niladhari Service was introduced in 1963Rattota was declared as a Divisional Secretariat which consists of 54 Grama Niladhari Divisions.

Grama Niladhari Divisions
Bandarapola
Godapola
Warapitiya
Dombagoda
Uda Hapuwida
Pahala Hapuwida
Hangarankanda
Muwandeniya
Neluwakanda
Watassayaya
Pitakanda
Kandenuwara East
Palleyaya
Epitamulla
Kandenuwara West
Alwatta
Thambalagala
Punchi Seluwakanda
Ulpathapitiya
Palle Weragama
Koswana North
Uda Weragama
Wiharagama
Ikiriyagolla
Koswana South
Meda Weragama
Kaineka
Pahala Owala
Ihala Owala
Pallet aka Pallet aka
Kaikawala
Maradurawala
Lonville
Udagama
Bogambara
Galekoluwa
Alakolamada
Gansarapola
Maussagolla
Bodhikotuwa
Weralugastenna
Wanaraniya
Bambarakiri ella
Madawaththa
Madakumbura
Rattota
Welangahawaththa
Kuruwawa
Horagolla
Nikawella
Dankanda
Polwattakanda
Kirimatiya
Dambagolla

References
 Rattota Divisional Secretariat
 Divisional Secretariats Portal

Divisional Secretariats of Matale District
Geography of Matale District